Traona is a comune (municipality) in the Province of Sondrio in the Italian region Lombardy, located about  northeast of Milan and about  west of Sondrio.

Traona borders the following municipalities: Cercino, Civo, Cosio Valtellino, Mello, Morbegno, Novate Mezzola.

Demographic evolution

References

Cities and towns in Lombardy